The 1975–76 Colorado State Rams men's basketball team represented the Colorado State University as a member of the Western Athletic Conference during the 1975–76 men's basketball season. The Rams finished the regular season with a record of 10–16, 6–8.

Schedule

References 

Colorado State
Colorado State Rams men's basketball seasons
1975 in sports in Colorado
1976 in sports in Colorado